Cowboy's Back in Town is the eleventh studio album by American country music artist Trace Adkins. It was released on August 17, 2010 via Show Dog-Universal Music Nashville. The first single "This Ain't No Love Song" was released to radio in May 2010 and debuted at number 54 on the  U.S. Billboard Hot Country Songs chart for the week of May 22, 2010. Also included on the album is "Ala-Freakin-Bama," a song that charted in late 2009 and was promoted by Adkins's former label, Capitol Nashville.

Background
Cowboy's Back In Town is the first release for Adkins under his new record deal with Show Dog-Universal Music, after his contract with Capitol Nashville was fulfilled with the release of 2008's X. Adkins also commented on the recording sessions of the album, saying "Toby has said this new music has a smile on it, and maybe that's just a reflection of where I'm at right now, I have this new sense of invigoration, and making this record was a lot of fun." In an interview with Billboard Magazine, Adkins talked about the album and the title, "I feel as energized and enthusiastic as I did when I first got a record deal, I'm having fun again, so [the title] 'Cowboy's Back in Town' just made sense to me."

Promotion
In promotion of the album, Adkins joined label-mate Toby Keith for his 2009 American Ride Tour. Adkins described his experience on the tour, saying "Touring with Toby last year changed my career, I got to see first hand that Toby and his organization place a premium on having fun and since that's what I got in this business for in the first place, this feels like the right place to be." He made television appearances on series such as the Today Show and The O'Reilly Factor on August 19, Fox & Friends on August 20. In addition, Adkins appeared on several late night talk shows including The Tonight Show with Jay Leno on September 14, Jimmy Kimmel Live! on September 15, Late Night with Jimmy Fallon on October 5, The Late Late Show with Craig Ferguson on October 12 and Chelsea Lately on October 19.

Content
Vernell Hackett with The Boot commented on the record, saying "Trace combines his usual serious material with upbeat and slightly off-kilter tunes on the new disc." She described the track 'Don't Mind If I Don't,' as "a song using love as the perfect excuse to relax and take it easy."

Critical reception

Upon its release, Cowboys Back in Town received generally positive reviews from most music critics. At Metacritic, which assigns a normalized rating out of 100 to reviews from mainstream critics, the album received an average score of 71, based on 4 reviews, which indicates "generally favorable reviews".

Thom Jurek with Allmusic said that Adkins was good at "offer tough[ing] utterly masculine, contemporary country-rock […] convincingly". Michael McCall with the Associated Press called the album "redneck humor and outlandish fun", he went to say that Adkins "could have drawn these songs from the comic routines of Larry the Cable Guy [...] But, this time out, Adkins is more salacious than sensitive — and makes it work for him".

Bill Brotherton with the Boston Herald commented that Adkins "has a heart. Who knew?" and thought that the "heartbreak" songs were the best. Whitney Pastorek with Entertainment Weekly gave the album  a "B" rating, saying that Adkins is one of "Nashville's most likable baritones" and that the album "works best when he puts his heart into it, instead of just his hat". Ken Tucker with Country Weekly gave it three-and-a-half stars out of five, saying that it balanced the "rugged" material such as "Whoop a Man's Ass" with love songs as "Still Love You." He also thought that "Don't Mind If I Don't" was "uncharacteristically sunny" and suggested that the song could bring a new aspect to his sound.

Jon Caramanica with The New York Times compared Adkins negatively to Toby Keith, saying that Adkins "lacks the winking cheekiness and self-deprecation". He thought that "Ala-Freakin-Bama" and "Brown Chicken, Brown Cow" had a similarly "clumsy approach to sexuality" to "Honky Tonk Badonkadonk," and thought that the love songs were "mundane," but called "Hold My Beer" the album's high point. Allison Stewart with The Washington Post gave the album a negative review, saying that it was less "cartoonish" than his previous work, but said that songs, such as "Hold My Beer," were not meant to be enjoyed by female fans.

Commercial performance
The album debuted at number five on the U.S. Billboard 200 selling 50,000 copies, being his first studio album since Dangerous Man in 2006 to chart in the top 10. It also became his fourth number one album on the U.S. Billboard Top Country Albums. As of the chart dated February 26, 2011, the album has sold 201,713 copies in the US.

Track listing

Personnel

 Trace Adkins – lead vocals
 David Angell – strings
 Adam Ayan – mastering
 Jeff Balding – engineer
 Kenny Beard – producer, production assistant, background vocals
 Steve Blackmon – assistant engineer
 Drew Bollman – mixing assistant
 Mike Brignardello – bass
 Jim "Moose" Brown – piano
 David Bryant – assistant engineer
 Pat Buchanan – electric guitar
 Perry Coleman – background vocals
 Peter Coleman – engineer
 Mickey Jack Cones – associate producer, editing, engineer, mixing, background vocals
 J. T. Corenflos – electric guitar
 Eric Darken – percussion
 David Davidson – strings
 Brandon Epps – editing
 Shelly Fairchild – background vocals
 Shawn Fichter – drums
 Tom Flora – background vocals
 Ashley Gorley – associate producer, background vocals
 Tony Harrell – clavinet, piano
 Wes Hightower – background vocals
 Jim Hoke – saxophone
 Mike Johnson – steel guitar, lap steel guitar
 Julian King – engineer
 Michael Knox – Producer, production assistant
 Jordan Lehning – engineer
 Kyle Lehning – mixing
 Sam Martin – assistant engineer
 Lee Moore – wardrobe
 Natalie Moore – art direction
 Greg Morrow – drums
 Justin Niebank – mixing
 Susannah Parrish – art direction, design
 Danny Rader – banjo, acoustic guitar
 Rich Redmond – percussion
 Sarighani Reist – strings
 Scotty Sanders – lap steel guitar, pedal steel guitar
 Adam Schoenfeld – electric guitar
 Jimmie Lee Sloas – bass
 Joe Spivey – fiddle, mandolin
 Pamela Springsteen – photography
 Russell Terrell – background vocals
 Trailer Choir – vocals on "Don't Mind If I Do"
 Biff Watson – acoustic guitar
 Kris Wilkinson – string arrangements, strings
 Debra Wingo-Williams – hair stylist, make-up
 John Willis – banjo, engineer

Chart positions

Album

End of year charts

Singles

References

2010 albums
Trace Adkins albums
Show Dog-Universal Music albums
Albums produced by Michael Knox (record producer)